Loudon Township is one of twenty townships in Fayette County, Illinois, USA.  As of the 2010 census, its population was 954 and it contained 418 housing units.

Geography

Extinct towns
 Greenland
 Magnolia Corner
 Post Oak
 Wrights Corner
 Bob Doane

Cemeteries
The township contains these nine cemeteries: Bob Doan, Dial, Dunkard, Mount Moriah, Post Oak, Ranson, Rhodes Family, Rogers and Spring Hill.

Major highways
  Illinois Route 33
  Illinois Route 128

Demographics

School districts
 Beecher City Community Unit School District 20
 Brownstown Community Unit School District 201
 Cowden-Herrick Community Unit School District 3a
 Ramsey Community Unit School District 204
 St Elmo Community Unit School District 202

Political districts
 Illinois' 19th congressional district
 State House District 102
 State Senate District 51

References
 
 United States Census Bureau 2007 TIGER/Line Shapefiles
 United States National Atlas

External links
 City-Data.com
 Illinois State Archives

Townships in Fayette County, Illinois
Populated places established in 1859
Townships in Illinois
1859 establishments in Illinois